Crystal Glacier is in North Cascades National Park in the U.S. state of Washington, on the south slopes of Mount Shuksan. Descending  from just east of the summit of Mount Shuksan, near its origination point, Crystal Glacier is connected to the larger Sulphide Glacier to the west. Below these cascades lies Sulphide Lake, which empties over Sulphide Creek Falls, one of the highest waterfalls in North America with a nearly  drop.

See also
List of glaciers in the United States

References

Glaciers of the North Cascades
Glaciers of Whatcom County, Washington
Glaciers of Washington (state)